Primary Structures: Younger American and British Sculptors was an exhibition presented by the Jewish Museum in New York City from April 27 to June 12 in 1966. The show was a survey of recent work in sculpture by artists from the Northeast United States, California and Great Britain that shared general characteristics of scale, simplified geometry and smooth, often colorful, industrial surfaces. Its legacy, which focuses on a subset of the artists in the show, is as the exhibition that introduced Minimal Art to the broad public, both through the exhibition itself and the wide attention it received in national media. Primary Structures was organized by Kynaston McShine, the Jewish Museum's Curator of Painting and Sculpture.

Response
This exhibit was a critical and media success as reported in Time and Newsweek, presenting the public with a show dedicated to a "New Art". Critical labels for the art included "ABC art," "reductive art" and "Minimalism," though these labels were all roundly rejected by the artists themselves, notably Donald Judd.

The Primary Structures art featured stripped-down forms and materials with smooth, shiny surfaces. One of the most unusual new ideas to come from the exhibit was the concept of an artist as a "designer", not necessarily as a "maker". During a forum conducted at the museum on the "New Sculpture", in which McShine, Judd, Barbara Rose, Robert Morris, and Mark di Suvero participated, di Suvero famously remarked, "...my friend Donald Judd cannot qualify as an artist because he doesn't do the work", to which Judd replied, "...The point is not whether one makes the work or not... I don't see... why one technique is any more essentially art than another..." This show ushered in a radical new way of presenting ideas and space that did not rely on the artist's hand, but rather on the final result.

McShine, in an effort to broaden appeal and show a wide variety of artists working in this form, included a West Coast contingent and most of the British artists from the "New Generation" show at the Whitechapel Art Gallery from 1965. It appeared that Primary Structures was to be formulated around Anthony Caro's former St. Martin's students, and the American group led by a relatively established Tony Smith.

1993 renovation
In 1989, a major expansion and renovation project was undertaken at the museum. Upon completion in June 1993, the layout of the Primary Structures show was done away with, and only a few installation shots of the show remain to record the original exhibit and the old galleries.

Listing

Sculpture Court/Entry

David Annesley, Swing Low, 1964
Anthony Caro, Titan, 1964
Tony Smith, Free Ride, 1962

Lobby

Judy Cohen Gerowitz (Judy Chicago), Rainbow Picket, 1966
Robert Smithson, Cryosphere, 1966

Gallery 1

Dan Flavin, corner monument 4 for those who have been killed in ambush (for Jewish Museum) (for *P.K. who reminded me about death), 1964
Peter Forakis, JFK, 1963
Ellsworth Kelly, Blue Disc, 1963
Forrest Myers, Zygarat & W. & W.W.W., 1965
Salvatore Romano, Zeno II, 1965
William Tucker, Meru I, 1964
William Tucker, Meru II, 1964
William Tucker, Meru III, 1964–65
David von Schlegell, Wave, 1964

Underpass

Gerald Laing, Indenty, 1966
Gerald Laing, Trace, 1965
Tina Matkovic (Spiro), Projection, 1965

Gallery 2

Carl Andre, Lever, 1966
Lyman Kipp, Andy's Cart Blanche
Tim Scott, Peach Wheels, 1962
Richard Van Buren, Free Epton, 1966
Isaac Witkin, Nagas, 1964

Gallery 3

Tony DeLap, Ka, 1965
Tom Doyle, Over Owl's Creek, 1966

Gallery 4

Richard Artschwager, Table with Pink Tablecloth, 1964
Richard Artschwager, Rocker, 1965–75
Michael Bolus, No. 7, 1965
Paul Frazier, Pink Split, 1965
Douglas Huebler, Bradford 2-66, 1966
John McCracken, Northumberland, 1965
Peter Phillips, Tricurvular, 1964–65
Anne Truitt, Sea Garden, 1964

Gallery 5

Ronald Bladen, Three Elements, 1965
Robert Grosvenor, Transoxiana, 1965
Donald Judd, Untitled, floor 1966
Donald Judd, Untitled, wall 1966
Robert Morris, Untitled (L Beams), 1966-67

Gallery 8

Larry Bell, Untitled(peach)
Larry Bell, Untitled(pink)
Larry Bell, Untitled(gold)
Walter de Maria, Cage, 1961-65
Sol LeWitt, Untitled, 1966

Gallery 10

Daniel Gorski, Fourth Down
David Gray, LA/2, 1965
David Hall, Izzard, 1966
Phillip King, Through, 1966
John McCracken, Manchu, 1965
Peter Pinchbeck, Space Jump
Michael Todd, Viet, 1966
Michael Todd, Ball Joint, 1966
Derrick Woodham, Siviley, 1965

Notes

References
 Altshuler, Bruce, The Avant-Garde in Exhibition: New Art in the 20th century (Harry N. Abrams, Inc., 1994). 
 Battcock, Gregory ed., Minimal Art: A Critical Anthology (E.P Dutton & Co, Inc., 1968). .
 Goldstein, Ann, A Minimalist Future? Art as Object 1958-1968 (MIT Press, 2004). 
 Juliff, Toby, 'A New Generation of British Art: A Problem of Provincialism' in Australian and New Zealand Journal of Art: vol 18, n.1 (Power Institute, Sydney, 2018) ({https://doi.org/10.1080/14434318.2018.1481335})
 McShine, Kynaston, Primary Structures: Younger American and British Sculptors (Jewish Museum: New York, 1966)
 Meyer, James, Minimalism: Art and Polemics of the Sixties (Yale University Press, 2000). 
 Meyer, James ed., Minimalism (Phaidon Press Limited, 2000). 

Sculpture exhibitions
Contemporary art exhibitions
1966 in New York City
Cultural history of New York City